Grace, stylized Grace., is a 2014 U.S. drama film directed by Heath Jones and written by Jones and Cindy Goggins, starring Annika Marks, Sharon Lawrence, Chase Mowen and Cindy Joy Goggins. It is produced by Sylvia Caminer and was first released at the Nashville Film Festival on 18 April 2014.

Cast
 Annika Marks as Grace Turner
 Sharon Lawrence as Sonia
 Chase Mowen as Reef
 Cindy Joy Goggins as Jessie
 Liam Springthorpe as Pickles

References

External links
 
 

2014 films
American drama films
Films set in Florida
Films shot in Florida
Films about alcoholism
2014 drama films
2010s English-language films
2010s American films